Elixir is an Australian jazz trio formed in Brisbane in 1997 by Katie Noonan and Nick Stewart from ARIA award-winning, double-platinum selling band george and River Petein. 
Isaac Hurren joined the group prior to the release of their debut album. Since then Petein and Stewart have left while Stephen Magnusson joined the group on jazz guitar in 2005.

To date, they have released two studio albums and have won an ARIA Award.
"We’re about freedom and spontaneity, particularly in a live set," explains Noonan.

Studio albums

Awards and nominations

AIR Awards
The Australian Independent Record Awards (commonly known informally as AIR Awards) is an annual awards night to recognise, promote and celebrate the success of Australia's Independent Music sector.

|-
| AIR Awards of 2011
|First Seed Ripening
| Best Independent Jazz Album
| 
|-

ARIA Music Awards
The ARIA Music Awards is an annual awards ceremony that recognises excellence, innovation, and achievement across all genres of Australian music.

! 
|-
| 2011
|First Seed Ripening
| Best Jazz Album
| 
| 
|-
| 2018
|Gratitude and Grief
| Best Jazz Album
| 
| 
|-

References

Musical groups established in 1997
1997 establishments in Australia
Musical groups from Brisbane
ARIA Award winners